Mamyan ممیان is a village located 20 km south-west of Jhelum, 3 km West of River Jhelum and 0.5 km North of River Bunhar in Pakistan.

Nearby settlements include:
West - Jagta 2 km
North - Alang 1.3 km, Kolian 1 km
East - Khurd 1.5 km, Chotala 2 km
South - Padiala, Darapur, Chakri

References

External links

Populated places in Jhelum District